Lt. George Harold Pugh (16 January 1890 – 5 September 1916) was a rugby union player who represented Australia.

Pugh, a lock, was born in Glebe, New South Wales and claimed 1 international rugby cap for Australia.

Pugh enlisted in the British army in 1912 and trained for six weeks in Liverpool, and joined the Liverpool Regiment as a second lieutenant. He joined the Australian Expeditionary Force in 1915. He was killed in action in the First World War while serving with the 4th Battalion of the Australian Infantry. He is buried at the Railway Dugouts Burial Ground in Ypres.

See also
 List of international rugby union players killed in action during the First World War
 1912 Australia rugby union tour of Canada and the U.S.

References

External links

Australian rugby union players
Australia international rugby union players
1890 births
1916 deaths
Sportsmen from New South Wales
Australian military personnel killed in World War I
Burials at Railway Dugouts Burial Ground (Transport Farm) Commonwealth War Graves Commission Cemetery
Rugby union players from Sydney
Rugby union locks
King's Regiment (Liverpool) officers
Military personnel from New South Wales